Leigh Snowden (June 23, 1929 – May 16, 1982) was an American actress in motion pictures and television.

Early life
Snowden was born Martha Lee Estes in Memphis, Tennessee, U.S. When her father died when she was three, Estes and her mother moved to Covington, Tennessee. When she was 16, Estes married her classmate, James Snowden, and moved with him to San Francisco, California, when he joined the military. After the birth of two children, a girl and boy, Leigh and James Snowden got an uncontested divorce with Leigh gaining custody of the children.

Early career
After her divorce, Snowden moved to Los Angeles, California, and worked in modeling and in small parts on television. She got her big break into show business on a Jack Benny Christmas show that was televised from the San Diego Naval Base. When Snowden walked across the stage in front of an audience of 10,000 sailors, the sailors cheered and whistled so enthusiastically that 11 Hollywood studios contacted her the next day. The event led to the newspaper headline "Sailors' Whistles Blow Blonde into Film Studio". Snowden chose Universal Pictures because of the training provided by its film school; she began voice and acting classes with Mara Corday, Pat Crowley, Clint Eastwood, James Garner, and John Saxon.

Snowden appeared in the films All That Heaven Allows, The Square Jungle, The Creature Walks Among Us, Outside the Law, I've Lived Before, and Hot Rod Rumble in addition to television appearances. Her last performance in movies was as Evie in The Comancheros (1961). Her last TV roles came in episodes of This Is Alice (1958) and Tightrope (1960).

In 1956, Snowden met accordionist Dick Contino at a party given by actor Tony Curtis. In September, after a three-month acquaintance, Snowden and Contino were married. Contino's family, who were Catholic, originally objected to the marriage because Snowden was divorced, but they relented and attended the civil ceremony in a Beverly Hills hotel. Snowden and Contino had three children together, in addition to her two children from her first marriage. Snowden left acting after her marriage and the birth of their first child. She sometimes appeared with him, as a singer, in his nightclub acts.

Return to acting
In 1971, Snowden appeared in the role of Maggie in the Fresno Community Theater production of Cat on a Hot Tin Roof by Tennessee Williams. She professed a love of the stage, though she claimed to be nervous about having to appear in her slip during most of the play's second act.

Death
Snowden died of cancer at age 52 on May 16, 1982, in North Hollywood, California.

Filmography

Film

Television

References

External links

 
 

1929 births
1982 deaths
American stage actresses
American television actresses
People from Covington, Tennessee
Actresses from Tennessee
Deaths from cancer in California
American film actresses
20th-century American actresses